Mishkinsky District (Mişkä rayonı; , Miškan kundem) is an administrative and municipal district (raion), one of the fifty-four in the Republic of Bashkortostan, Russia. It is located in the north of the republic and borders with Burayevsky District in the west and north, Baltachevsky District in the north, Karaidelsky District in the east, Blagoveshchensky District in the southeast, and with Birsky District in the south and southwest. Its administrative center is the rural locality (a selo) of Mishkino. As of the 2010 Census, the total population of the district was 25,318, with the population of Mishkino accounting for 23.8% of that number.

History
The district was established in 1930. It has a large Mari population - 80% .

Administrative and municipal status
Within the framework of administrative divisions, Mishkinsky District is one of the fifty-four in the Republic of Bashkortostan. The district is divided into fourteen selsoviets, comprising seventy-seven rural localities. As a municipal division, the district is incorporated as Mishkinsky Municipal District. Its fourteen selsoviets are incorporated as fourteen rural settlements within the municipal district. The selo of Mishkino serves as the administrative center of both the administrative and municipal district.

References

Notes

Sources

Districts of Bashkortostan
States and territories established in 1930